Biotechnology Letters is a scientific journal of biotechnology published by Springer Science+Business Media. The editors-in-chief are Steven W. Singer and Paula Meleady. According to the Journal Citation Reports, the journal has a 2020 impact factor of 2.461.

References

External links
 

Biotechnology journals
Springer Science+Business Media academic journals
Biweekly journals
Publications established in 1979
English-language journals